Dusty Bates is a 1947 British, Technicolor, children's film, directed by Darrell Catling and starring Ronald Shiner as 'Squeaky' Watts and Anthony Newley in the title role. It was produced by Gaumont-British Instructional and Children's Entertainment Films. The film was also presented by the Rank Organisation. The story was filmed in four parts. The film score was created by Jack Beaver.

DVD release
The Adventures of Dusty Bates was released on Region 0 DVD-R by Alpha Video on 28 January 2014.

References

External links
 
 
 
 
 

1947 films
British children's films
Films scored by Jack Beaver
British black-and-white films
1940s children's films
1940s English-language films
1940s British films